Pleucadeuc is a commune in the Morbihan department of Brittany in north-western France.

The name comes from the Breton word Plou and the name Cadoc, a Breton saint,  meaning Parish of Cadoc.  Numerous megaliths are to be found around the commune.

Demographics
Inhabitants of Pleucadeuc are called in French Pleucadeuciens.

At the census of 1999, the population was 1482. The commune had 1,804 inhabitants in 2017.

Geography

Map

Event
Pleucadeuc holds an annual festival on 15 August for pairs of twins and multiples called rassemblement "Deux et plus" ("the Two and more" gathering"). This festival started in 1994 and has become France's largest annual gathering of twins, with approximately 1,000 sets attending each year, and one of the largest such events in Europe.

See also
Communes of the Morbihan department

References

External links

 Mayors of Morbihan Association 

Communes of Morbihan
Twin